Dolgaya Shchel is a fjord on the northwestern coast of the Kola Peninsula, Murmansk Oblast, Russia.

See also
List of fjords of Russia

References 

Bays of the Barents Sea
Bays of Murmansk Oblast
Fjords of Russia